is a mountain located in Shizuoka Prefecture, Japan. The southern half of the mountain is called Mount Asama. It is said to be the origin of "Shizu" in "Shizuoka".

References 

Shizuhata
Shizuoka (city)